Hum Farishte Nahin is a 1988 Indian Hindi-language film directed by Jatin Kumar. It stars Raj Babbar, Poonam Dhillon, Om Puri, Rameshwari. Smita Patil has given a special appearance as former lover of Raj Babbar's character.

Plot

Cast
Raj Babbar as Rajesh "Raja"
Om Puri as Gopi "Tala Master"
Poonam Dhillon as Sunita
Rameshwari as Komal
Smita Patil as Roma (Special Appearance)
Deepak Seth as Baldev 
Kulbhushan Kharbanda as Shivraj Verma
Sushma Seth as Mrs. Supriya Verma
Amrish Puri as Purushottam / Dindayal

Music

External links
 

1988 films
1980s Hindi-language films
Indian action films
1988 action films
Films scored by Manoj–Gyan